Alexander Snow Gordon (? - 1803) was an American silversmith and inn-keeper, active in New York City. Little is known of his life, aside from the fact that he started business in 1795 at 40 William Street in New York City. He was a founding member and first master (1801, 1802) of the Washington Lodge of Free and Accepted Masons.

References 
 "Alexander S. Gordon", in Washington Lodge, No. 21, F. & A.M., and Some of Its Members, Robert W. Reid (M.D.), Washington Lodge, 1911, page 159.
 Proceedings of the Grand Lodge of Free and Accepted Masons of the State of New York, The Grand Lodge, 1902, page 155.
 American Silversmiths and Their Marks: The Definitive (1948) Edition, Stephen Guernsey Cook Ensko, Courier Corporation, 1983, page 63.
 The Arts and Crafts in New York: Advertisements and News Items from New York City Newspapers, Volume 69, New York Historical Society, 1965, page 97.

American silversmiths